Olszewo-Chlebowo  is a settlement in the administrative district of Gmina Stupsk, within Mława County, Masovian Voivodeship, in east-central Poland.

From 1975-1998 the town administratively belonged to the Ciechanów Voivodeship.

References

Olszewo-Chlebowo